Irish to the Core is the seventh album by Irish folk and rebel band The Wolfe Tones. The album features a number of political songs including Botany Bay and Rock on Rockall.

Track list 
 Botany Bay
 The Water is Wide
 The Irish Brigade
 Graine Mhaoil
 Whelan's Frolics
 The Night Before Larry was Stretched
 Fiddler's Green
 The Vale of Avoca
 The Limerick Races
 The Jackets Green
 The Cook in the Kitchen and the Rambling Pitchfork
 Kevin Barry
 Rock on Rockall

References

The Wolfe Tones albums
1976 albums